Brachypnoea rotundicollis is a species of leaf beetle. It is found in North America. It was first described by the American entomologist Charles Frederic August Schaeffer in 1906.

References

Further reading

 

Eumolpinae
Articles created by Qbugbot
Beetles described in 1906
Beetles of the United States
Taxa named by Charles Frederic August Schaeffer